The Peruvian colonial architecture, developed in the Viceroyalty of Peru between the 16th and 19th centuries, was characterized by the importation and adaptation of European architectural styles to the Peruvian reality, yielding an original architecture.

Early academia has tended to view the Spanish architectural and religious takeover as complete and swift, but revisionist history emphasizes the lasting role of the indigenous in religious architecture.

The use of building systems as the quincha, the ornamentation of Andean iconography and solutions to give new forms to Peruvian viceroyal architecture an own identity.

Renaissance style

In the early days of the Viceroyalty was developed the Renaissance style, which had occurred in Europe following the stream of the Italian Renaissance. This style was characterized by the use of ornaments and watermarks that were giving away the architectural lines of the building's likeness chiseled work of silver, hence the name plateresque and where art blends Gothic, Romanesque and Arabic of the colonial period, from the 16th to mid-17th century. These are magnificent examples of this style in Lima facades of the Cathedral of Lima and the Casa de Pilatos. In Ayacucho the facades of the churches of San Francisco and La Merced.

Baroque style

The Baroque was distinguished and characterized by his heavy ornamentation, of predominantly curved lines, giving an aspect of free movement. Predominant decorative elements in columns, pilasters, cornices, and a modification of the classical forms, the Greek columns lose their purity to wring, as thick snakes, its trunks to form Solomonic column and ornaments acquired great exuberance.

A characteristic feature of this style is the rustication that appears on the walls of the Monastery of San Francisco, Lima. This style prevailed since the middle of the 17th to the late 18th century, subsequently giving rise to Churrigueresque and Rococo. There are representative examples of Baroque in Lima, the Torre Tagle Palace, the churches of San Francisco and San Marcelo. In Cuzco the Cathedral of Cuzco (Andean Baroque), the churches of Santo Domingo and San Sebastián. In Arequipa the Church of la Compañía.

Andean Baroque
During the late seventeenth and eighteenth century in the southern Andes (Southern Peru and Bolivia) a new style developed which blended European Baroque with indigenous (Inca, Aymara) features such as the kantuta flower and Inka maskaypacha crown as well as native flora and fauna (Arequipa papayas and the Chiguanco thrush). It was created by primarily by indigenous sculptors, sometimes inspired by textile patterns. The new style appeared primarily on the stone carved facades of churches and palaces, first in Arequipa and later in the Lake Titicaca region and further south to Oruro and even into Chile. It was one of the most vigorous combinations of styles in all of colonial Latin America. The most important buildings are the Church of la Compañía and Puno Cathedral.

Churrigueresque baroque

It was the most ornate Baroque and distinguished by the use of complicated and whimsical ornaments exaggerated, his advocate was a Spanish architect named José de Churriguera. These are magnificent examples of this style in Lima the facade of churches of Nuestra Señora de la Merced and San Agustín.

Rococo
See also Rococo.
In the 18th century, with the introduction of the French Bourbon dynasty, came to Spain this style that was characterized by non-rounded balconies, the decrease of ornaments in the ornamentation in columns (these are less twisted) while the characteristics of the baroque are the use of curves and undulating lines.
The characteristics of rococo are: the Quinta de Presa, the Casa de Larriva (rococo facade but Granadian), the Trece Monedas House (rococo facade Lima), the Osambela House and Paseo de Aguas, all located in Lima.

Neoclassical style

In the late 18th and early 19th century came the style called neoclassical, which was characterized by the dominance of a trend towards the return of the classic styles of Greco-Roman architecture (using Romanesque columns with Corinthian capitals and without ornamentation, straight lines and simplicity in them, in addition to triangular frontispiece).

It was as a reaction against the baroque. These are magnificent examples of this style the altar and the towers of the Cathedral of Lima, the facade of the Basilica and Convent of San Pedro, the main altar of the Basilica and Convent of San Francisco, pilasters of the Osambela House, the facade of Fort Santa Catalina and Presbyter Matías Maestro Cemetery.

See also
 Architecture of Peru
 Balconies of Lima
 List of architectural styles

Notes

External links
Colonial Architecture Project by Gauvin Alexander Bailey

.
Viceroyalty of Peru

Architecture in Bolivia
Architecture in Peru
Colonial Peru
Tourist attractions in Peru